Seán Bugler (born 1998) is an Irish Gaelic footballer who plays for Dublin SFC club St Oliver Plunketts/Eoghan Ruadh and at inter-county level with the Dublin senior football team. He usually lines out as a defender.

Career

Bugler first played Gaelic football at juvenile and underage levels with the St Oliver Plunketts/Eoghan Ruadh club before eventually progressing onto the club's senior team. He first appeared on the inter-county scene with the Dublin minor football team in 2016 before winning an All-Ireland U21 Championship title the following season. Bugler was drafted onto the Dublin senior football team in 2019 and was part of the extended panel for the All-Ireland Championship-winning team. He won a Sigerson Cup title with DCU Dóchas Éireann in 2020, before ending the season by claiming an All-Ireland winners' medal on the field of play. Bugler has also won three consecutibe Leinster Championships and a National League

Honours

DCU Dóchas Éireann
Sigerson Cup: 2020

Dublin
All-Ireland Senior Football Championship: 2019, 2020
Leinster Senior Football Championship: 2019, 2020, 2021
National Football League: 2021
All-Ireland Under-21 Football Championship: 2017
Leinster Under-21 Football Championship: 2017

References

External link
Robbie McDaid profile at the Dublin GAA website

1998 births
Living people
DCU Gaelic footballers
St Oliver Plunketts/Eoghan Ruadh Gaelic footballers
Dublin inter-county Gaelic footballers
People educated at St. Declan's College, Dublin